Lectionary 2138 designed by sigla ℓ 2138 (in the Gregory-Aland numbering). It is a Greek minuscule manuscript of the New Testament, written on 260 paper leaves (20.0 cm by 27.2 cm).

Description 

The text is written in two columns per page, in 26 lines per page.

The codex contains Lessons from the four Gospels lectionary (Evangelistarium). It was written in 1627 in Wallachia, by a scribe named Loukas Buzau.

History 

The codex was purchased by Kenneth Willis Clark. Currently it is located in the Kenneth Willis Clark Collection of the Duke University (Gk MS 39) at Durham.

See also 
 List of New Testament lectionaries
 Biblical manuscripts
 Textual criticism

References

Further reading 

 Duke University, Library Notes 51 and (1985), 57.

External links 
 Lectionary 2138 at the Kenneth Willis Clark Collection of Greek Manuscripts 
 Lectionary 2138 at the Duke University

Greek New Testament lectionaries
17th-century biblical manuscripts
Duke University Libraries